Trevor Blumas (born October 16, 1984) is a Canadian television and film actor and singer-songwriter.

Early life and career
Blumas was born in London, Ontario, Canada. Trevor Blumas went to school at the Lester B. Pearson School for the Arts, studying drama, music, dance, and art. Blumas was part of the Original Kids Theatre Company in Ontario alongside Rachel McAdams, and Amber Marshall. He was nominated in 1999 Young Artist Award for "Best Performance", for his performance in Stranger in Town. Blumas co-starred in the Disney film Ice Princess (2005) alongside Michelle Trachtenberg. Blumas studied film at Santa Monica College and is currently completing an honors degree in cinema studies and art history at the University of Toronto.

Music
As a teenager, Blumas took a break from acting to form the reggae band "Staylefish." The band went on to receive minor success around the Canadian college circuit, before Trevor left for Los Angeles to pursue his acting career. After re-locating back to Toronto, he started Corduroy (or Whatever Happened to Corduroy?) an indie-rock group that independently released a series of PWYC demo ep's they dubbed Demoroy's. Corduroy's music recently appeared in an online campaign for Chevrolet and in an episode of Degrassi: The Next Generation. Corduroy eventually dissolved in 2010. Trevor is currently working on Doom Squad, an electronic music project he started with his two sisters Jaclyn and Allie. In early 2011, Doom Squad released their debut EP entitled "Land O' The Silver Birch" and subsequently set out on a west coast tour to promote it.

Blumas was the main protagonist in the 2015 music video for Fucked Up's song "Year of the Hare".

Filmography

References

External links
 

1984 births
Canadian male child actors
Canadian male film actors
Canadian male singer-songwriters
Canadian singer-songwriters
Canadian male television actors
Living people
Male actors from London, Ontario
Musicians from London, Ontario
21st-century Canadian male actors
21st-century Canadian male singers